The 1938–39 Serie C was the fourth edition of Serie C, the third highest league in the Italian football league system.

Season
A sixth group was created by the FIGC to introduce more clubs from Southern Italy and reducing the travels in that part of the country. After protests from Northern Italy, a seventh and an eighth group were added.

Legend

Girone A

Girone B

Girone C

Girone D

Girone E

Girone F

Girone G

Girone H

Final rounds

Group A (North)

Group B (South)

References

1938-1939
3
Italy